The Črni Vrh dialect (črnovrščina) is a Slovene dialect in the Rovte dialect group. It is spoken in Črni Vrh, the upper Idrijca Valley, Hotedršica, and Rovte.

Phonological and morphological characteristics
The Črni Vrh dialect lacks pitch accent. Its phonemic inventory contains soft consonants and it has voicing contrast in final position.

References

Slovene dialects